Angelo Azura Jimenez is a Filipino lawyer who is currently serving as the 22nd president of the University of the Philippines.

Education
Jimenez earned his sociology and law degrees from the University of the Philippines Diliman. He passed the Bar examination in 1994.

He later became a Lee Kuan Yew Fellow of the Harvard Kennedy School of Government. He received his master's degree in public management from the Lee Kuan Yew School of Public Policy at the National University of Singapore.

Career

Law
Jimenez is an Of counsel with the Jaromay Laurente and Associates and a consultant of a House member.

Academe
Jimenez served on the University of the Philippines (UP) Board of Regents twice: as a student regent (1992) and as a regent (2016–2021). He was a lecturer at the UP Law Center Institute of the Administration of Justice (2016–2021).

Government service
Jimenez is an expert on Philippine overseas labor issues and global migration. He served in the Overseas Workers Welfare Administration as an acting deputy administrator, as well as in the Department of Labor and Employment. He also served as labor attaché in Japan. 

He received two presidential citations for his efforts to protect Overseas Filipino Workers in Middle East.

Media
Jimenez is an opinion writer on ABS-CBN News website.

UP president
In December 2022, Jimenez was elected by the UP Board of Regents as the 22nd university president over five other nominees. His term began on February 10, 2023.

References

External links
 

Living people
Year of birth missing (living people)
Place of birth missing (living people)
Filipino lawyers
Academic staff of the University of the Philippines
University of the Philippines Diliman alumni
National University of Singapore alumni